Southern Base Engineer Group 2 was formed in the European Theater of Operations United States Army on 1 August 1943.

Composition
The units were as follows:

 332nd Engineer General Service Regiment
 333rd Engineer Special Service Regiment
 354th Engineer General Service Regiment
 437th Engineer Maintenance Company
 416th Engineer Dump Truck Company
 419th Engineer Dump Truck Company
 517th Engineer Dump Truck Company
 518th Engineer Dump Truck Company
 389th Engineer Battalion (separated unit)
 359th Engineer General Service Regiment
 1302nd Engineer General Service Regiment
 1278th Engineer Combat Battalion
 204th Engineer Combat Battalion
 300th Engineer Combat Battalion

References

Groups of the United States Army
Military units and formations established in 1943
Engineering units and formations of the United States Army